Vitreolina parfaiti is a species of sea snail, a marine gastropod mollusk in the family Eulimidae.

Distribution
This species occurs in the Atlantic Ocean off the Canary Islands

References

 Warén, A. (1984). A generic revision of the family Eulimidae (Gastropoda, Prosobranchia). Journal of Molluscan Studies. suppl 13: 1-96

External links
 Folin L. de. (1884). Appendice. description de trois espèces nouvelles du genre Eulima. Bulletin de la Société de Géographie de Rochefort. 5: 143-146

Vitreolina
Gastropods described in 1887